Sara Tomic (born 5 February 1998) is a professional Australian tennis player. She is the younger sister of tennis player Bernard Tomic.

In June 2015, she won her first professional-level title in Sharm El Sheikh, Egypt.

Tomic was born in Gold Coast, Queensland, and made her senior Grand Slam debut at the 2015 Australian Open, in the doubles event partnering Naiktha Bains.

Career

2014
Tomic mainly played on the ITF Junior Circuit. She was given wildcards into the Sydney International, Australian Open and Burnie International where she lost in first rounds. In the junior events she won a Grade-4 event in Kawana and a Grade-B2 event in Lautoka, Fiji. She was also runner-up in a Grade 3 in Beijing and a Grade 4 in Burleigh Waters. She won two doubles titles partnering Xu Shilin including the Grade-A Osaka Mayor's Cup and a Grade B1 in Seogwipo.

2015
Tomic had received wildcards into the Sydney International losing to Alexandra Dulgheru in the first round. She was then awarded another qualifying and doubles wildcard into the Australian Open where she lost to Ekaterina Bychkova, in three sets in the first round. In the doubles event, she partnered Naiktha Bains; they lost to Anastasia Rodionova and Arina Rodionova in the first round. At the junior Australian Open, Tomic reached the third round before she lost to the eventual champion Tereza Mihalíková, and she also reached the semifinals of the doubles event, partnering Xu Shilin.

Tomic then decided to focus on the pro circuit instead, winning her first title at a $10k Sharm El Sheikh event in July, and boosting her ranking into the top 500.

ITF finals

Singles: 6 (3–3)

Doubles: 3 (2–1)

References

External links
 
 
 

1998 births
Living people
Australian female tennis players
Tennis people from the Gold Coast
Australian people of Bosnia and Herzegovina descent
Australian people of Croatian descent
Australian Roman Catholics